Laura Maraschi is an Italian astronomer.
She works for the Brera Astronomical Observatory. In 2013, she was on the organizing committee of the International Astronomical Union Symposium 304.

Works

References 

Living people
Year of birth missing (living people)
21st-century Italian astronomers
Italian women scientists